is a women's football club playing in Japan's football league, the Nadeshiko League Division 1. Its hometown is the city of Kamogawa.

Current squad

Results

References

External links 
 official site
 Japanese Club Teams

Women's football clubs in Japan
Association football clubs established in 1991
1991 establishments in Japan
Sports teams in Chiba Prefecture
Kamogawa, Chiba